The men's 4000 metre freestyle was an event on the Swimming at the 1900 Summer Olympics schedule in Paris. It was the longest of the three freestyle events. It was held on 15 August and 19 August 1900. 29 swimmers from 7 nations competed. The event was won by John Arthur Jarvis of Great Britain, completing a double with the 1000 metre freestyle. Zoltán Halmay of Hungary took silver, with Louis Martin of France earning bronze.

Jarvis swam using the front crawl; Halmay used the Trudgen stroke.

Background

The 4000 metre freestyle event was held only once, and was the longest Olympic swimming event until the 10 kilometre open water event was introduced in 2008.

John Arthur Jarvis was the dominant long distance swimmer of the time and a heavy favourite in this event. He was in the midst of a run of British titles in the 880 yard (1898-1901), mile (1897-1902) and long-distance (1898-1904).

Competition format

The competition used a two-round format, with semifinals and a final. The entrants were divided into three semifinals; each semifinal had between 9 and 11 swimmers. The fastest swimmer in each semifinal advanced to the final along with the next six fastest times overall. This resulted in a 9-swimmer final.

The races were swum downstream in the Seine.

Schedule

Results

Semifinals

In the first round, there were three semifinals. The winner of each semifinal advanced to the final, as did the six fastest losers from across all the semifinals. The semifinals were held on 15 August.

Semifinal 1

Semifinal 2

Semifinal 3

Final

The final was held on 19 August. Jarvis won easily, more than ten minutes ahead of Halmay.

Results summary

References

Swimming at the 1900 Summer Olympics